Laila is a 1984 Indian Hindi movie directed by and with lyrics by Saawan Kumar. The music is by Usha Khanna. The film stars Anil Kapoor, Poonam Dhillon, Sunil Dutt, Pran and Anita Raj.

Trivia

This was to be Anil Kapoor's official launch as leading man in Bollywood. That's why the opening titles read "Introducing Anil Kapoor". But Anil Kapoor went and signed Woh 7 Din on the side and quickly completed the film. He failed to report this to Sawaan Kumar Tak, making him very angry when he discovered what happened. Anil also did not tell Saawan Kumar Tak that he had done a film titled Kahan Kahan Se Guzar Gaya, 2 years prior. Since that film was completed and stuck not being released, Anil signed another film titled Rachna. Again, Anil refused to tell Sawaan Kumar Tak about this. Sawaan was made to believe Anil Kapoor would only be doing his film.

Cast 

  Sunil Dutt as Dharamraj Singh / Thakur Prithviraj Singh (Dual role) 
  Anil Kapoor as Kumar Deshraj Singh
  Poonam Dhillon as Laila
  Anita Raj as Padmini Singh (as Anita Raaj)
  Pradeep Kumar as Pir Saab
  Pran as Bharat Singh
  Satyendra Kapoor as Ram Singh (as Satyen Kapoo)
  Yunus Parvez as Sarwar Sheikh
  Yogeeta Bali as Mrs. Sunaina Dharamraj Singh (as Yogita Bali)
  Neena Gupta as Salma
  Jagdish Raj as Thakur (Sunaina's Father)
 Ramesh Deo as Chandru,Driver and Laila Father
 Seema Deo as  Durga, Chandru Wife and Laila Mother
Jankidas as Pandit
Manik Irani as Bharat Singh Henchman
 Suchita Trivedi as Child Artist Role of Padmini Singh

Soundtrack
All the songs were composed by Usha Khanna and lyrics were penned by Saawan Kumar.

The songs "Saath Jiyenge Saath Marenge" and "Ho Gaye Deewane Tumko Dekhkar" were very popular songs during those days.

References

External links 
 

1984 films
1980s Hindi-language films
Hindi films remade in other languages
Films scored by Usha Khanna